The 2018 K League 2 was the sixth season of the K League 2, the second tier South Korean professional league for association football clubs since its establishment in 2013, and the first one with its current name, the K League 2. The top-ranked team and the winner of the promotion play-offs among three clubs ranked between second and fourth were promoted to the K League 1 after the regular season ends.

Teams
Gyeongnam FC, the first-placed team of the 2017 K League Challenge was promoted to the 2018 K League 1. Gwangju FC was relegated from the top tier. A total of ten teams contested the league.

Stadiums 
Primary venues used in the K League Challenge included:

Personnel and kits

Note: Flags indicate national team as has been defined under FIFA eligibility rules. Players may hold more than one non-FIFA nationality.

Foreign players
Restricting the number of foreign players strictly to four per team, including a slot for a player from AFC countries. A team could use four foreign players on the field each game.

As of 24 July 2018.

1 Although Wang Chien-ming represents Chinese Taipei at international level, he is considered Korean for squad registration purposes.

League table

Positions by matchday

Round 1–18

Round 19–36

Results

Matches 1–18

Matches 19–36

Promotion-Relegation Playoffs
Promotion and relegation playoffs were held between the 3rd to 5th clubs of 2018 K League 2 and the 11th club of 2018 K League 1. If scores are tied after regular time at the Semi-Playoff and Playoffstage , the higher placed team advances to the next phase. The same conditions do not apply to the final Promotion-Relegation Playoffs.

Semi-Playoff

Playoff

Promotion-Relegation Playoffs

First leg

Second leg

FC Seoul won 4–2 on aggregate

Season statistics

Top scorers

Top assists

Attendance

References

External links
Official K League website 

K League 2 seasons
K
K